Orlando Fernandez (born January 18, 1963 in Yabucoa) is a former Puerto Rican professional boxer. He competed in the men's featherweight event at the 1984 Summer Olympics. After turning professional in 1985, he would go to defeat former world champion Julio Gervacio by ninth round knockout on December 15, 1989, then become WBO super bantamweight world champion on May 12, 1990 after stopping Valerio Nati in Italy. Fernandez lost his title in his fight against Jesse Benavides on May 24, 1991.

On July 14, 1996, Fernandez fought Marco Antonio Barrera for Barrera's WBO world Super Bantamweight title in Denver, Colorado, losing that fight by seventh round knockout. He then retired after losing to Kevin Kelley in his next contest, by a tenth round knockout on July 12, 1997, at Tunica, Mississippi.

Fernandez had 30 professional fights, of which he won 22 and lost 8, with 13 wins by knockout and 2 losses-his last two contests-lost by knockout also.

See also
List of super-bantamweight boxing champions

References

External links

1963 births
Living people
People from Yabucoa, Puerto Rico
Puerto Rican male boxers
Super-bantamweight boxers
Featherweight boxers
World super-bantamweight boxing champions
World Boxing Organization champions
Olympic boxers of Puerto Rico
Boxers at the 1984 Summer Olympics